The Stade Georges-Bayrou is a football stadium located in Sète, France. It was the home of FC Sète 34 before the inauguration of the Stade Louis-Michel in 1990. It was named after Georges Bayrou, former president of FC Sète. However, the ground is still used by the club for training. Amateur club Pointe-Courte AC Sète is now a tenant of the stadium.

References

FC Sète 34
Football venues in France
Sports venues in Hérault